The Ministry of Health (translit. Misrad HaBri'ut) is a ministry in the Israeli government, responsible for formulating health policies. The ministry plans, supervises, licenses, and coordinates the country's health care services. In addition to overseeing health services provided by Kupat Holim and family health centers such as Tipat Halav, the ministry maintains general hospitals, psychiatric hospitals, mental health clinics, treatment programs for substance abuse, and facilities for the chronically ill.

The current acting Minister of Health is Yoav Ben-Tzur.

History 
In January 2021, the ministry entered a collaborative agreement with Pfizer granting the company access to Israel citizens' personal electronic medical records in order to observe the real-world safety and efficacy of the BNT162b2 COVID-19 vaccine product.

In February 2022, the ministry banned medical professionals in Israel from providing conversion therapy.

List of ministers

Deputy ministers

See also
Health care in Israel
List of hospitals in Israel

References

External links
Official website

Health
Ministry of Health
Health
 
Israel